The Raid on Chester occurred during the American Revolution when the US privateer, Captain Noah Stoddard of Fairhaven, Massachusetts, and four other privateer vessels attacked the British settlement at Chester, Nova Scotia on 30 June 1782. The town was defended by Captain Jonathan Prescott and Captain Jacob Millett.

Background 
During the American Revolution, Nova Scotia was invaded regularly by American Revolutionary forces by land and sea. Throughout the war, American privateers devastated the maritime economy by raiding many of the coastal communities. There were constant attacks by privateers, which began seven years earlier with the raid on St. John and included raids on all the major outposts in Nova Scotia. The first raid on Chester occurred in 1779 and the second three years later.

Raid on Chester 

On June 30, the day before the raid on Lunenburg, Stoddard and two other privateers descended on Chester, Nova Scotia firing cannon from their vessels. Captain of the militia Jonathan Prescott fired cannon from the blockhouse. (The cannon Prescott used are now located on the grounds of the Chester Legion.) Prescott's cannon fire struck one of the privateers. As a result, the privateers retreated behind Nass' Point. The crews went ashore and requested of Prescott to bury their dead. Prescott indicated that if they disarmed themselves, they would be assisted.  Eventually, Prescott invited Stoddard and the two other captains to tea. Realizing the community was still vulnerable to attack, Prescott and his son lied to the privateers that Commander Creighton at Lunenburg had sent 100 soldiers to be billeted at Chester that evening. Upon the privateers' retreat to their vessels, Captain Jacob Millett led women and children marching in red colours, pretending to be British soldiers from Lunenburg. The privateers left Chester to raid Lunenburg the following day.

Aftermath 

The day after the raid on Chester, the American privateers redirected their attack on Lunenburg, presumably believing the Lunenburg militia had left the town to defend Chester.

Jonathan Prescott was suspected of being an American Patriot sympathizer given that, after the initial hostile engagement, he reportedly allowed Captain Noah Stoddard to bury his dead and then had tea with him the day before Stoddard orchestrated the raid on Lunenburg. People were also suspicious of Prescott's allegiance, because a number of Dr. Prescott's family were Patriots in the American Revolution; his nephew Samuel had ridden with Paul Revere. Samuel eventually was taken prisoner to Halifax where he is reported to have died during the war. Jonathan named one of his sons after Samuel and he is buried at the Old Burying Ground in Halifax. Jonathan's son Joseph joined the Continental Army, fought at Fort Ticonderoga, and was a founding member of the Society of the Cincinnati. Another of Dr. Prescott's sons John fought in the Battle of Lexington. His other son was Charles Ramage Prescott.

After the war, Jonathan Prescott was given the blockhouse, the modern-day Wisteria Cottage House, and used it as his home.

See also 
 
 Colonial American military history
 Military history of Nova Scotia

References

Bibliography 
 A Naval History of the American Revolution
 DesBrisay, Mather Byles (1895). History of the County of Lunenburg, pp. 62–68
 Eastman, Ralph M. (1928) "Captain Noah Stoddard" in Some Famous Privateers of New England. pp. 61–63
 Gwyn, Julian (2003). Frigates and Foremasts: The North American Squadron in Nova Scotia Waters, 1745–1815, University of British Columbia Press. .
 MacMechan, Archibald  (1923), "The Sack of Lunenburg" in Sagas of the Sea. The Temple Press, pp. 57–72.
  A History of American Privateers
 Massachusetts Privateers, p. 176
  Agnes Creighton, "An Unforeclosed Mortgage," Acadiensis, October, 1905

 Primary documents
 The Boston Gazette, and the Country Journal, Monday, July 15, 1782.
 The Massachusetts Spy: Or, American Oracle of Liberty [Worcester], Thursday, July 25, 1782.
 The Continental Journal, Boston, Thursday, July 18, 1782.
 Joseph Pernette to Franklin, letter, dated at LaHave, July 3, 1782, reprinted in DesBrisay, Mather Byles, History of the County of Lunenburg, Toronto: Wesley Briggs, 1895, pp. 65–67.
 Leonard Rudolf's account in Invasion of Lunenburg in Acadie and the Acadians

Further reading 
 Howe, Octavius Thorndike (1922). Beverly Privateers in the Revolution, p. 361.
 Bell, Winthrop Pickard (1961). The "Foreign Protestants" and the Settlement of Nova Scotia.
 Faibisy, John Dewar  Privateering and piracy: the effects of New England raiding upon Nova Scotia during the American Revolution, 1775–1783.

External links 
 Sack of Lunenburg Plaque
 Sacking of Lunenburg – Primary Sources
 
 Sack of Lunenburg – American War of Independence at Sea
 MA Scammel

Conflicts in Nova Scotia
Military history of Nova Scotia
Conflicts in 1782
1782 in Nova Scotia
Military raids
Chester